The Pacifica Quartet is a professional string quartet based in Bloomington, Indiana. Its members are: Simin Ganatra, first violin; Austin Hartman, second violin; Mark Holloway, viola; and Brandon Vamos, cello. Formed in 1994 by Ganatra and Vamos with violinist Sibbi Bernhardsson and violist Kathryn Lockwood, the group won prizes in competitions such as the 1996 Coleman Chamber Music Competition, the 1997 Concert Artists Guild Competition, and the 1998 Naumburg Chamber Music Competition. In 2001, violist Masumi Per Rostad replaced Lockwood. The group subsequently received Chamber Music America's prestigious Cleveland Quartet Award in 2002, the Avery Fisher Career Grant in 2006, and was named "Ensemble of the Year" by Musical America in 2009. In 2017, violinist Austin Hartman replaced Bernhardsson and violist Guy Ben-Ziony replaced Rostad. 

The Pacifica Quartet tours throughout the Americas, Europe, and Asia. The ensemble is known for its traversal of the complete string cycles of a single composer, and in recent years have toured and recorded the quartets of Elliott Carter, Mendelssohn, Beethoven and Shostakovich.

Currently the ensemble serves as Quartet-in-Residence and full-time faculty at the Jacobs School of Music at Indiana University in Bloomington. The members of the Pacifica Quartet are also Resident Performing Artists at the University of Chicago and were previously the Quartet-in-Residence at the University of Illinois School of Music from 2003 to 2012.

History

The quartet was conceived at the Music Academy of the West Summer School in Santa Barbara, California, when fellow students, violist Kathryn Lockwood and violinist Josefina Vergara, decided they would create a string quartet for the sake of entering a competition in the Los Angeles area. Vergara invited Simin Ganatra, originally from southern California but still a student in Oberlin, Ohio, and filled in the application with the name, "Pacifica Quartet", having yet to hold a single rehearsal. The name came from the ocean within view of the Music Academy.  Ganatra invited cellist Brandon Vamos, who was finishing graduate school in New Haven, Connecticut, resulting in a part-time, cross-country commitment. Within a year, the group went full-time when they all moved from their respective locations to the Chicago area for post-graduate study, although Vergara soon returned to California and was eventually replaced by Sibbi Bernhardsson, establishing the first long-term iteration of the quartet. Ganatra and Sibbi Bernhardsson had both been students of well-known pedagogues Roland and Almita Vamos, whose son is Brandon Vamos, Bernhardsson having come from Iceland to study with the Vamoses. In 1997, Bernhardsson collaborated with violist Masumi Per Rostad at Yale School of Music's Norfolk Chamber Music Festival. Rostad was subsequently invited to join the Pacifica Quartet a few years later, shortly after Lockwood's departure in 2001. At the end of the 2016–2017 season, Austin Hartman replaced Bernhardsson and Guy Ben-Ziony replaced Rostad.

Members

Simin Ganatra, violin
Austin Hartman, violin
Mark Holloway, viola
Brandon Vamos, cello

Residencies

Indiana University Jacob's School of Music, Quartet-in-residence and full-time faculty members, Fall 2012 – present
University of Chicago, Artist-in-Residence of Contempo, 1999 to present
The Metropolitan Museum of Art in NY, Quartet-in-Residence, 2009-2012
University of Illinois at Champaign-Urbana, Quartet-in-residence, 2003-2012
The Longy School in Cambridge, MA, Visiting Artists in Chamber Music, 2006-2009

Exploration of Complete String Quartet Cycles

The Pacifica Quartet gained international recognition as an interpreter of string quartet cycles.  They have given performances of the Pulitzer Prize-winning composer Elliott Carter's cycle in San Francisco, New York, Chicago, Houston, Los Angeles, Tokyo, Edinburgh and London; the Mendelssohn cycle in Atherton, Pittsburgh, as well as cities in Australia and Germany; and the Beethoven cycle in New York, Denver, St. Paul, Chicago, Napa, and Tokyo (in a presentation of five concerts in three days at Suntory Hall). The Quartet presented the complete cycle of fifteen quartets by Dmitri Shostakovich in Chicago and New York during the 2010–2011 season and in Montreal and at London's Wigmore Hall in the 2011–2012 season.

Volumes III and IV of the complete string cycle of Dmitri Shostakovich released: 2013
Volumes I and II of the complete string cycle of Dmitri Shostakovich released: 2011 & 2012 
Performs the complete Shostakovich string quartet cycle during the Soviet Experience festival in Chicago and at The Metropolitan Museum of Art in New York: 2010-2011 
Volumes I and II of the complete string quartets by Elliott Carter on Cedille Records released: 2008-2009 
First Australian tour, Mendelssohn cycle: 2008-2009 
Beethoven cycle tour: 2007-2008 
Complete Mendelssohn string quartets released on Cedille Records: 2005 
Elliott Carter's string quartet cycle, first world tour: 2002/03

Premieres & New Commissioning Projects

 "Dooryard Bloom" by Jennifer Higdon.  To be premiered February 19, 2013 with Nathan and Julie Gunn at the Carnegie Hall.
 “Return” by Keeril Makan, premiered October 24, 2012, co-commissioned by the Celebrity Series of Boston and the Great Lakes Chamber Music Festival.
 “String Quartet” by Eric Brinkmann, premiered May 14, 2010 with Contempo at the University of Chicago 
“Quintet for Alto Saxophone and String Quartet” by Ellen Taaffe Zwilich, premiered with Ashu in December 2009.  Commissioned by the Arizona Friends of Chamber Music.
"Redemption: Book I" by Christos Hatzis, premiered October 2009 at City Music Cleveland.
 Piece by Alex Berezowky, premiered May 28, 2009 with Contempo at the University of Chicago 
“Distant Glimmerings” by Steve Winfield, premiered May 28, 2009 with Contempo at the University of Chicago 
“Fantasia Sobre ‘Soledad’” by Andrews Carrizo, premiered May 28, 2009 with Contempo at the University of Chicago 
“Midair” by Takuma Tanikawa, premiered May 15, 2009 with Contempo at the University of Chicago 
“Time and the Bell…” by Gerald Levinson, received Chicago premiere on October 4, 2008 with Contempo at the University of Chicago 
"Quasi Sinfonia” by David M. Gordon, premiered on May 23, 2008 with Contempo at the University of Chicago 
“String Quartet No. 1” by Füsun Köksal, premiered on May 23, 2008 with Contempo at the University of Chicago 
“Electric Pastoral” by Simon Fink, premiered on May 9, 2008 with Contempo at the University of Chicago 
“Nekudot for String Sextet” by Josef Bardanashvili, premiered on April 7, 2007 with Contempo at the University of Chicago 
“Oasis for String Quartet and Tape” by Franghiz Ali-Zadeh, received Chicago premiere on February 2, 2007 with Contempo at the University of Chicago 
“Metamorphoses for Viola and Piano” by Josef Bardanashvili, received Chicago premiere on February 2, 2007 with Contempo at the University of Chicago 
“Minyo” by Kotoka Suzuki, received Chicago premiere on February 2, 2007 with Contempo at the University of Chicago 
‘Power Chords” by Dmitri Tymoczko, premiered in 2006 with Cleveland contemporary youth orchestra.
“Changing Lanes for String Quartet and Electronics” by Krzysztof Wolek, premiered May 17, 2005 with Contempo at the University of Chicago 
“Awakening Captive for Solo Piano, Soprano, 14 Players and Computer” by William Coble, premiered May 17, 2005 with Contempo at the University of Chicago 
“Afterglow – String Quartet No. 3” by Yao Chen, premiered May 3, 2005 with Contempo at the University of Chicago 
“Celebrations for Piano and Chamber Orchestra” by John Austin, premiered January 23, 2005 with Contempo at the University of Chicago 
“Quartet No. 5” by Ezra Sims, premiered November 2003, commissioned by Arizona Friends of Chamber Music.
”Mosiacs” by Marta Ptaszynska, premiered July 2002, commissioned by Caramoor International Music Festival.
“Piano Quintet, ‘Tableau Funebres’” by Claude Baker, premiered March 2003 with Ursula Oppens, commissioned by Louisville Chamber Music Society.
Julia Hemphill: “One Atmosphere for piano and string quartet” by Julia Hemphill, premiere recording in 2003 
“String Quartets” by Easley Blackwood, premiere recording release on Cedille Records in 1999.

Discography

Contemporary Voices, Cedille Records, 2021. With Otis Murphy, alto saxophone.  2021 GRAMMY Award Winner for Best Chamber Music/Small Ensemble Performance.
Souvenirs of Spain and Italy, Cedille Records, 2019. With Sharon Isbin, guitar.
Brahms Piano Quintet Op. 34, Schumann String Quartet No. 1 Op. 41, Cedille Records, 2017. With Menahem Pressler, piano.
Mozart & Brahms Clarinet Quintets (K. 581 & Op. 115), Cedille Records, 2014. With Anthony McGill, clarinet.
The Soviet Experience Box Set, Cedille Records, 2014 (Collection of Vol. 1-4 in a box) 
The Soviet Experience: Shostakovich & Contemporaries, Vol. 4, Cedille Records, 2013 
The Soviet Experience: Shostakovich & Contemporaries, Vol. 3, Cedille Records, 2013 
The Soviet Experience: Shostakovich & Contemporaries, Vol. 2, Cedille Records, 2012 
The Soviet Experience: Shostakovich & Contemporaries, Vol. 1, Cedille Records, 2011 
Elliott Carter String Quartets 2, 3 & 4, Naxos, 2009 
Elliott Carter String Quartets 1 & 5, Naxos, 2008  2009 GRAMMY Award winner for Best Chamber Music Performance.
Mendelssohn:  The Complete String Quartets, Cedille Records, 2005 
Declarations:  Music Between the Wars, Cedille Records, 2006 
Julius Hemphill: One Atmosphere, Tzadik, 2003 
Dvořák:  Quartet, Op. 106, Quintet, Op. 97, Cedille Records, 2002  With Michael Tree, viola.
String Quartets by Easley Blackwood, Cedille Records, 1999

Special Projects

The Soviet Experience

"The Soviet Experience" was a fourteen-month-long multidisciplinary festival that took place in Chicago, IL during the 2010/11 season. Spearheaded by Shauna Quill, Executive Director of University of Chicago Presents, the festival was inspired by the Pacifica Quartet's plan to perform all fifteen of Dmitri Shostakovich's string quartets in Chicago, the first time the city hosted the entire cycle.
Eleven different institutions collaborated to present works by visual artists, choreographers, composers, and dramatists who lived under the Politburo of the Soviet Union in more than 48 events in a dozen venues across Chicago, making it one of the largest inter-disciplinary collaborative efforts in Chicago since the Silk Road Chicago project in 2006/07. In addition to five concerts during the season, the Pacifica Quartet gave master classes and free noon-time lecture demonstrations throughout the festival.

Awards and recognition
Grammy Award, 2021, Best Chamber Music/Small Ensemble Performance for "Contemporary Voices"
Named Ensemble of the Year by Musical America: 2009 
Grammy Award for Best Chamber Music Performance (Carter's Quartets Nos. 1 & 5): 2009  
Avery Fisher Career Grant: 2006 
Cover of Gramophone magazine, “Five new quartets you should know about”: 2005
Chamber Music America's Cleveland Quartet Award: 2002
Appointed members of Lincoln Center's CMS Two: 2002
Naumburg Chamber Music Award: 1998
Concerts Guilds Competition:1997

Publications

Per Rostad, Masumi, “My Viola is a Porsche-More or Less,” Strings November 2011.
Per Rostad, Masumi, “The Challenges and Joys of Quartet Playing," Gramophone, October 26, 2010.
Per Rostad, Masumi, “Mortality and Meaning of Beethoven’s Late Quartet, Op. 132," Strings, May 2009.
Vamos, Brandon, “Never Too Late,” Gramophone, March 2009

Podcasts

In 2011, Boston's WGBH radio started hosting violist Masumi Per Rostad's series of podcasts, Inner Voice. Often recorded in the far-flung locales where chamber music is presented, the podcasts take one behind the scenes in conversations with fellow musicians and insiders from the world of classical music and offer a sense of what it is like to be on the road as a touring musician today.

References

External links
  Hear the Pacifica Quartet in concert from WGBH Boston 
 www.pacificaquartet.com
 https://web.archive.org/web/20010423120526/http://cedillerecords.org/pacifica.html

American string quartets
Musical groups from Illinois
Musical groups established in 1994
Grammy Award winners
Cedille Records artists